The 2014–15 World Series Sprintcars (known as the Enzed World Series Sprintcars due to sponsorship) was the 28th running of the World Series Sprintcars in Australia. It ran over 13 rounds from 26 December 2014 until 21 February 2015.

Mount Gambier driver Steven Lines was the defending champion from 2013–14, and looked to defend his title from the likes of multiple Australian champions Max Dumesny, Brooke Tatnell and James McFadden, as well as a host of Australia's top drivers, along with drivers (especially during the start of the season) from the World of Outlaws in the United States, which are in the winter off-season. However, it was Tatnell who won his 9th championship title, after Dave Murcott – who had led Tatnell by 80 points going into the final race at Perth Motorplex – crashed out of the race with 5 laps remaining. Tatnell finished the race in 3rd place, and as a result, claimed the championship by 27 points.

It was the last major sprintcar title for Shane Krikke, the Western Australia-based car owner for Tatnell; Krikke died in June 2016 of cancer.

Schedule

Races

Note:  In Australia, car numbers are preceded by State of Origin identification.

See also
 Sprint car racing

References

External links
 

Speedway in Australia
Sprint car racing
World Series Sprintcars
World Series Sprintcars